Risco Plateado is a stratovolcano in Argentina, with an elevation of  above sea level.

The volcano has produced long lava flows, although the more proximal parts of the flow were later degraded by glaciation. The volcano has been assigned a Holocene age given the young appearance of some of its eruption products. The volcanism was at first dacitic and later changed to basaltic andesite (GVP).

See also
 List of volcanoes in Argentina
 List of Ultras of South America

References

External links
 "Cerro Risco Plateado, Argentina" on Peakbagger

Stratovolcanoes of Argentina
Subduction volcanoes
Mountains of Argentina
Polygenetic volcanoes
Holocene stratovolcanoes